Violent Revolution is the tenth studio album by German thrash metal band Kreator. It was released on 25 September, 2001 and is the band's first album to feature lead guitarist Sami Yli-Sirniö. After almost a decade of musical experimentation with their metal sound (starting with Renewal), with this album the band returned to their 1980s thrash metal style, although it does make use of Gothenburg metal elements. 

Violent Revolution is now considered to be the catalyst of the early 2000s thrash metal revival movement.

Reception
In 2005, Violent Revolution was ranked number 436 in Rock Hard magazine's book of The 500 Greatest Rock & Metal Albums of All Time.

Track listing

Personnel
Kreator
Mille Petrozza – vocals, rhythm guitar
Sami Yli-Sirniö – lead guitar
Christian Giesler – bass
Ventor – drums
Production
Andreas Marschall – cover painting
Tommy Newton – engineering
Dirk Schelpmeier – design, photography
Andy Sneap – production, engineering, mastering, mixing

Charts

References

External links
Kreator Terrorzone: Violent Revolution

2001 albums
Kreator albums
SPV/Steamhammer albums
Albums produced by Andy Sneap